Native River (foaled 4 May 2010) is an Irish-bred, British-trained, Thoroughbred racehorse who races under National Hunt rules. He is a specialist long-distance steeplechaser known for his front-running style and apparently inexhaustible stamina. He won three minor hurdle races but began to show better form in the 2015/16 when taking the Worcester Novices' Chase and the Mildmay Novices' Chase. He emerged as a top-class steeplechaser in the following season when he won the Hennessy Gold Cup, Welsh Grand National and Denman Chase as well as finishing third in the Cheltenham Gold Cup. In the spring of 2018 he won a second Denman Chase before recording his biggest win in the 2018 Cheltenham Gold Cup.

Background
Native River is a chestnut gelding, with a white blaze and four white socks bred in Ireland by Fred Mackey. As a foal he was consigned to the Tattersalls Ireland National Hunt sale in November 2010 and was bought for €6,000 by John Dineen.

He was sired by Indian River, a top-class jumper in his native France, where his wins included the Prix du Président de la République. As a breeding stallion, the most notable of his other offspring has been the Hennessy Gold Cup winner Madison du Berlais. Native River's dam, Native Mo was an unraced daughter of Be My Native. As a descendant of the Irish broodmare Rose Cygnet (foaled 1927) she was distantly related to Milady Rose (Irish 1,000 Guineas), Dragonara Palace (Richmond Stakes) and Brondesbury (Norfolk Stakes).

Racing career

2014/15 season
Native River began his racing career on the amateur point-to-point circuit, unseating his rider at the Dromahane meeting on 17 March 2014. He was then sent to England and entered professional training with Colin Tizzard at Milborne Port, in Dorset. He finished third in a National Hunt Flat race at Newton Abbot Racecourse on 10 October and then recorded his first success in a Novices' Hurdle race at Stratford Racecourse three weeks later. A month later, he started at odds of 10/1 for a more valuable novice event at Newcastle Racecourse and won by  lengths from the favourite  Red. When stepped up in class, Native River finished last of the six runners in the Challow Novices' Hurdle and then fell at the penultimate flight in the Classic Novices' Hurdle. In a Novices' hurdle at Exeter Racecourse in February, he started at odds of 9/2 and won by  lengths from the Paul Nicholls-trained Emerging Talent. In March he made his first appearance at the Cheltenham Festival where he started a 40/1 outsider for the Spa Novices' Hurdle and came home ninth of the ten finishers.

2015/16 season
In the 2015/16 season Native River was campaigned in Novices' steeplechases, starting with a third place at Chepstow Racecourse in October. A sixteen-length win at Exeter followed before the gelding was stepped up in class for the Worcester Novices' Chase over three miles at Newbury Racecourse on 26 November. Ridden as in most of his races up to then by Brendan Powell he took the lead approaching the final fence and drew away to win by almost four lengths from Un Temps Pour Tout. One of his owners, Garth Broom, said "He's only five and giving weight away against older, more experienced horses... he's got it all, he can stay and he can quicken". He was made favourite for the Feltham Novices' Chase at Kempton Park Racecourse but after jumping awkwardly he finished third to Tea For Two.

After finishing third to Blaklion and  Red in the Towton Novices' Chase at Wetherby Racecourse in February, the gelding was sent for a second time to the Cheltenham Festival to contest the National Hunt Chase Challenge Cup and finished runner-up behind Minella Rocco. On his final appearance of the year Native River was sent to Aintree Racecourse in April for the Mildmay Novices' Chase in which he started the 11/2 third favourite behind Un Temps Pour Tout and Blaklion, both of whom had won at Cheltenham. Ridden by Richard Johnson, who was to become his regular jockey, he led for most of the way and stayed on strongly to win by three lengths from Henri Parry Morgan. After the race Tizzard said "One of his main attributes is staying. The horse runs a bit lazy but there's nothing wrong with that, they last a bit longer. Richard had to wake him up once or twice but he was straight back into his stride. He obviously loves that ground with his lovely, low action."

2016/17 season
Native River began his fourth campaign by finishing second to Silsol in the West Yorkshire Hurdle at Wetherby Racecourse in October before returning to steeplechase fences. For the Hennessy Gold Cup at Newbury on 26 November he was assigned a weight of 155 pounds and started the 7/2 favourite in a nineteen-runner field. Racing in first or second place for most of the way he took a clear lead after the final fence and held off the late challenge of the outsider Carole's Destrier to win by half a length. Colin Tizzard commented "It looked like he would win by five lengths, but when Carole's Destrier nearly got to him, he went again. It is a sign of a good, honest stayer. We expected a big run, but he travelled better than ever before and jumped beautifully". A month later Native River carried top weight of 165 pounds in the Welsh Grand National over three and three quarter miles at Chepstow. Starting the 11/4 favourite he took the lead before halfway and won by one and three-quarter lengths from Raz de Maree with fifteen lengths back to Houblon des Obeaux in third.

In the Denman Chase at Newbury on 11 February in which Native River was opposed by Bristol de Mai (Finale Juvenile Hurdle, Scilly Isles Novices' Chase) and Le Mercurey (Future Champion Novices' Chase) he led from the start and won by three and a quarter lengths. On 17 March the gelding started the 7/2 second favourite behind Djakadam for the 2017 Cheltenham Gold Cup and disputed the lead for most of the way before finishing third, beaten two and three quarter lengths and a short head by Sizing John and Minella Rocco.

2017/18 season
After an absence of almost eleven months, Native River returned to action in the Denman Chase on 10 February 2018. Starting the 8/11 favourite he repeated his 2017 success as he led from the start and won by twelve lengths from Cloudy Dream. The 2018 edition of the Cheltenham Gold Cup attracted a field of fifteen and saw Native River start 5/1 third favourite behind Might Bite (King George VI Chase) and Our Duke (Irish Grand National). The other runners included  Red, Djakadam, Tea For Two, Killultagh Vic (Irish Daily Mirror Novice Hurdle), Road To Respect (Leopardstown Christmas Chase), Outlander (Lexus Chase) and Edwulf (Irish Gold Cup). Native River led from the start but was consistently pressed by Might Bite in second place. Might Bite took the lead two fences out but Native River rallied to regain the advantage at the last obstacle and pulled away on the run-in to win by four and a half lengths. After the race Richard Johnson said "I felt we’d gone quite steady but sometimes when you’re on a good horse it doesn’t feel that quick. I knew Native River's a stayer and he answered every call... he's just a warrior and it's a pleasure to ride him... very few horses are as straightforward and brave as he is."

Cheltenham Gold Cup record

•2017 - third, 7yo, 7-2.
(Official rating 168)

•2018 - first, 8yo, 5-1.
(Official rating 166)

•2019 - fourth, 9yo, 6-1.
(Official rating 173)

•2021 - fourth, 11yo, 12-1.
(Official rating 172)

Pedigree

References

2010 racehorse births
Racehorses bred in Ireland
Racehorses trained in the United Kingdom
Thoroughbred family 31
Cheltenham Gold Cup winners
Cheltenham Festival winners
National Hunt racehorses
Welsh Grand National winners